Dandakaranyam is a 2016 Indian Telugu action drama  film directed and produced by R. Narayana Murthy under Sneha Chitra Pictures banner. The  film features R. Narayana Murthy and Gaddar in the lead roles. The film was released on 18 March 2016.

The film is against the backdrop of exploitation of forested areas and the bauxite mining in Visakha Agency, Visakhapatnam District.

Cast
 R. Narayana Murthy as Koteswara Rao
 Gaddar

Release
Dandakaranyam was released on 18 March 2016 across Telangana and Andhra Pradesh.

References

2010s Telugu-language films
Films set in forests
Films about mining